Angela Cornelia Monica Popp (born September 10, 1968) is working as a director, screenwriter, songwriter and producer in Los Angeles, New York, San Francisco, Berlin, Hamburg and Munich.

Life and career 
Angela C. Popp was born on September 10, 1968, in West Berlin.

After she got her A-Level, she studied at the University of Arts Berlin from October 1992 until April 1995 with studies in Visual Communication. While in school, she has worked for FAB (Television from Berlin) from February 1993 until May 1995. She also spent time in Berlin, from November 1997 until February 1998 taking a seminar in Film Producing given by Willi Egger.

From 1997 to 2003, she moved back and forth from Los Angeles and Berlin. Then she moved to Los Angeles to live and work there as a Resident Artist. In 2005 the Directors Guild of Germany decided to accept her as a member. After she produced "HIV positive women", Popp took classes in film directing at LA Film School from June, 2005 - September 2005. When she returned to Berlin, she took a seminar in Screenwriting at the Masterschool of Screenwriting Medienboard Berlin/Brandenburg. She was accepted into the German Director's Guild in 2005. 
In August 2010 she participated in the Screenwriting Master Class of Filmmakers Alliance in Los Angeles,U.S.A.
Currently she is performing in a Band as a Lead Singer.In 2013 her new Album "Homesick" from her Band "California Hemp Pirates" will be released.L.A. is her Home Until Present Day.

Film festivals
The Last Supper, aka Abendmahl, was shown at the Morbegno Film Festival in Morbegno, Italy in 2002, at the British Film Institute's 17th London Lesbian & Gay Film Festival in 2003 and in 2004 at the Pink Screens Festival in Finland as well as at the Queer Zagreb International Film Festival.

She has also had a film shown at the Rhode Island Film Festival and at a Film festival in South Africa.

Filmography

Short films
 2012                  The Magic Of Three, short movie episodes Los Angeles, Feed The World
 2012                  The Magic Of Three, short movie episodes Hamburg, Just Like Heaven. The Sword Fighter on Rickmer Rickmers
 2011                  Affections
 2011 currently        The Magic Of Three, short movie episodes Berlin, 
 2010 currently        Who
 2007          	Fate	
 2006			Isolation
 2005			All about your fear	
 2003			Sweetheart		
 2002			Last Supper		
 2000			Secrets

Documentaries
 2011                  Metal-A Journey from the 80's...
 2009                  Model Casting by A-P Van York
 2007	                Modern Heroes
 2005 - 2006		Sand Sculptures	
 2004 - 2005		HIV positive women
 2004                  Sects
 1999-2002             Fairs: IFA,Expo,Cebit

References

External links
 
Profile at OFDb
WHO
A CALIFORNIA FILM
METAL
THE MAGIC OF THREE
THE LIBERTY BEING A DRAG

Living people
1968 births
American film directors
Berlin University of the Arts alumni